Thymidine monophosphate (TMP), also known as thymidylic acid (conjugate base thymidylate), deoxythymidine monophosphate (dTMP), or deoxythymidylic acid (conjugate base deoxythymidylate), is a nucleotide that is used as a monomer in DNA. It is an ester of phosphoric acid with the nucleoside thymidine. dTMP consists of a phosphate group, the pentose sugar deoxyribose, and the nucleobase thymine. Unlike the other deoxyribonucleotides, thymidine monophosphate often does not contain the "deoxy" prefix in its name; nevertheless, its symbol often includes a "d" ("dTMP"). Dorland’s Illustrated Medical Dictionary provides an explanation of the nomenclature variation at its entry for thymidine.

As a substituent, it is called by the prefix thymidylyl-.

See also 
 DNA
 Nucleoside
 Nucleotide
 Oligonucleotide
 RNA

References

Nucleotides
Phosphate esters